Barmacheh-ye Bala Mahal (also Romanized as Barmacheh-ye Bālā Maḩal; also known as Barmache, Barmacheh, and Barmacheh-ye Bālā Maḩalleh) is a village in Kateh Sar-e Khomam Rural District, Khomam District, Rasht County, Gilan Province, Iran. At the 2006 census, its population was 383, in 113 families.

References 

Populated places in Rasht County